CPRS may refer to:

Organisations
 Canadian Public Relations Society, a professional society for public relations practitioners
 Central Policy Review Staff, a government "think-tank" in the British Cabinet Office, 1971-1983
 , an early 20th-century Chinese organisation which counted Li Yanshan among its members
 Rio Grande do Sul Ports Captaincy, part of the 5th Naval District Command of the Brazilian Navy
 Canadian Pacific Railway, a North American Class I railroad

Other
 Carbon Pollution Reduction Scheme, a proposed emissions trading scheme in Australia
 Comprehensive Psychopathological Rating Scale, a rating scale for psychiatric symptoms and behaviour
 Canadian Performing Rights Society, the original name of the Composers, Authors and Publishers Association of Canada
 Computerized Patient Record System, the primary clinical health application for the U.S Department of Veterans Affairs' VistA health information system
 Controlled Premium Rate Services, United Kingdom telephone numbers subject to additional regulation

See also
CPR (disambiguation)
Complex regional pain syndrome (CRPS), a disorder of a portion of the body which manifests as extreme pain and other symptoms